In biology, abiogenesis (from a- 'not' + Greek bios 'life' + genesis 'origin') or the origin of life is the natural process by which life has arisen from non-living matter, such as simple organic compounds. The prevailing scientific hypothesis is that the transition from non-living to living entities on Earth was not a single event, but a process of increasing complexity involving the formation of a habitable planet, the prebiotic synthesis of organic molecules, molecular self-replication, self-assembly, autocatalysis, and the emergence of cell membranes. Many proposals have been made for different stages of the process.

The study of abiogenesis aims to determine how pre-life chemical reactions gave rise to life under conditions strikingly different from those on Earth today. It primarily uses tools from biology and chemistry, with more recent approaches attempting a synthesis of many sciences. Life functions through the specialized chemistry of carbon and water, and builds largely upon four key families of chemicals: lipids for cell membranes, carbohydrates such as sugars, amino acids for protein metabolism, and nucleic acid DNA and RNA for the mechanisms of heredity. Any successful theory of abiogenesis must explain the origins and interactions of these classes of molecules. Many approaches to abiogenesis investigate how self-replicating molecules, or their components, came into existence. Researchers generally think that current life descends from an RNA world, although other self-replicating molecules may have preceded RNA.

The classic 1952 Miller–Urey experiment demonstrated that most amino acids, the chemical constituents of proteins, can be synthesized from inorganic compounds under conditions intended to replicate those of the early Earth. External sources of energy may have triggered these reactions, including lightning, radiation, atmospheric entries of micro-meteorites and implosion of bubbles in sea and ocean waves. Other approaches ("metabolism-first" hypotheses) focus on understanding how catalysis in chemical systems on the early Earth might have provided the precursor molecules necessary for self-replication.

A genomics approach has sought to characterise the last universal common ancestor (LUCA) of modern organisms by identifying the genes shared by Archaea and Bacteria, members of the two major branches of life (where the Eukaryotes belong to the archaean branch in the two-domain system). 355 genes appear to be common to all life; their nature implies that the LUCA was anaerobic with the Wood–Ljungdahl pathway, deriving energy by chemiosmosis, and maintaining its hereditary material with DNA, the genetic code, and ribosomes. Although the LUCA lived over 4 billion years ago (4 Gya), researchers do not believe it was the first form of life. Earlier cells might have had a leaky membrane and been powered by a naturally-occurring proton gradient near a deep-sea white smoker hydrothermal vent.

Earth remains the only place in the universe known to harbor life, and fossil evidence from the Earth informs most studies of abiogenesis. The Earth was formed 4.54 Gya; the earliest undisputed evidence of life on Earth dates from at least 3.5 Gya. Fossil micro-organisms appear to have lived within hydrothermal vent precipitates dated 3.77 to 4.28 Gya from Quebec, soon after ocean formation 4.4 Gya during the Hadean.

Overview

Life consists of reproduction with (heritable) variations. NASA defines life as "a self-sustaining chemical system capable of Darwinian [i.e., biological] evolution." Such a system is complex; the last universal common ancestor (LUCA), presumably a single-celled organism which lived some 4 billion years ago, already had hundreds of genes encoded in the DNA genetic code that is universal today. That in turn implies a suite of cellular machinery including messenger RNA, transfer RNA, and ribosomes to translate the code into proteins. Those proteins included enzymes to operate its anaerobic respiration via the Wood–Ljungdahl metabolic pathway, and a DNA polymerase to replicate its genetic material.

The challenge for abiogenesis (origin of life) researchers is to explain how such a complex and tightly-interlinked system could develop by evolutionary steps, as at first sight all its parts are necessary to enable it to function. For example, a cell, whether the LUCA or in a modern organism, copies its DNA with the DNA polymerase enzyme, which is in turn produced by translating the DNA polymerase gene in the DNA. Neither the enzyme nor the DNA can be produced without the other. The evolutionary process could have involved molecular self-replication, self-assembly such as of cell membranes, and autocatalysis.

The precursors to the development of a living cell like the LUCA are clear enough, if disputed in their details: a habitable world is formed with a supply of minerals and liquid water. Prebiotic synthesis creates a range of simple organic compounds, which are assembled into polymers such as proteins and RNA. The process after the LUCA, too, is readily understood: biological evolution caused the development of a wide range of species with varied forms and biochemical capabilities. The derivation of living things such as the LUCA from simple components, however, is far from understood.

Although Earth remains the only place where life is known, the science of astrobiology seeks evidence of life on other planets. The 2015 NASA strategy on the origin of life aimed to solve the puzzle by identifying interactions, intermediary structures and functions, energy sources, and environmental factors that contributed to the diversity, selection, and replication of evolvable macromolecular systems, and mapping the chemical landscape of potential primordial informational polymers. The advent of polymers that could replicate, store genetic information, and exhibit properties subject to selection was, it suggested, most likely a critical step in the emergence of prebiotic chemical evolution. Those polymers derived, in turn, from simple organic compounds such as nucleobases, amino acids, and sugars that could have been formed by reactions in the environment. A successful theory of the origin of life must explain how all these chemicals came into being.

Conceptual history until the 1960s

Spontaneous generation

One ancient view of the origin of life, from Aristotle until the 19th century, is of spontaneous generation. This theory held that "lower" animals were generated by decaying organic substances, and that life arose by chance. This was questioned from the 17th century, in works like Thomas Browne's Pseudodoxia Epidemica. In 1665, Robert Hooke published the first drawings of a microorganism. In 1676, Antonie van Leeuwenhoek drew and described microorganisms, probably protozoa and bacteria. Van Leeuwenhoek disagreed with spontaneous generation, and by the 1680s convinced himself, using experiments ranging from sealed and open meat incubation and the close study of insect reproduction, that the theory was incorrect. In 1668 Francesco Redi showed that no maggots appeared in meat when flies were prevented from laying eggs. By the middle of the 19th century, spontaneous generation was considered disproven.

Panspermia

Another ancient idea dating back to Anaxagoras in the 5th century BC is panspermia, the idea that life exists throughout the universe, distributed by meteoroids, asteroids, comets and planetoids. It does not attempt to explain how life originated in itself, but shifts the origin of life on Earth to another heavenly body. The advantage is that life is not required to have formed on each planet it occurs on, but rather in a more limited set of locations (potentially even a single location), and then spread about the galaxy to other star systems via cometary or meteorite impact.

"A warm little pond": primordial soup

The idea that life originated from non-living matter in slow stages appeared in Herbert Spencer's 1864–1867 book Principles of Biology, and in William Turner Thiselton-Dyer's 1879 paper "On spontaneous generation and evolution". On 1 February 1871 Charles Darwin wrote about these publications to Joseph Hooker, and set out his own speculation, suggesting that the original spark of life may have begun in a "warm little pond, with all sorts of ammonia and phosphoric salts, light, heat, electricity, present, that a  compound was chemically formed ready to undergo still more complex changes." Darwin went on to explain that "at the present day such matter would be instantly devoured or absorbed, which would not have been the case before living creatures were formed."

Alexander Oparin in 1924 and J. B. S. Haldane in 1929 proposed that the first molecules constituting the earliest cells slowly self-organized from a primordial soup, and this theory is called the Oparin–Haldane hypothesis. Haldane suggested that the Earth's prebiotic oceans consisted of a "hot dilute soup" in which organic compounds could have formed. J. D. Bernal showed that such mechanisms could form most of the necessary molecules for life from inorganic precursors. In 1967, he suggested three "stages": the origin of biological monomers; the origin of biological polymers; and the evolution from molecules to cells.

Miller–Urey experiment

In 1952, Stanley Miller and Harold Urey carried out a chemical experiment to demonstrate how organic molecules could have formed spontaneously from inorganic precursors under prebiotic conditions like those posited by the Oparin–Haldane hypothesis. It used a highly reducing (lacking oxygen) mixture of gases—methane, ammonia, and hydrogen, as well as water vapor—to form simple organic monomers such as amino acids. Bernal said of the Miller–Urey experiment that "it is not enough to explain the formation of such molecules, what is necessary, is a physical-chemical explanation of the origins of these molecules that suggests the presence of suitable sources and sinks for free energy." However, current scientific consensus describes the primitive atmosphere as weakly reducing or neutral, diminishing the amount and variety of amino acids that could be produced. The addition of iron and carbonate minerals, present in early oceans, however produces a diverse array of amino acids. Later work has focused on two other potential reducing environments: outer space and deep-sea hydrothermal vents.

Producing a habitable Earth

Early universe with first stars

Soon after the Big Bang, which occurred roughly 14 Gya, the only chemical elements present in the universe were hydrogen, helium, and lithium, the three lightest atoms in the periodic table. These elements gradually came together to form stars. These early stars were massive and short-lived, producing all the heavier elements through stellar nucleosynthesis. Carbon, currently the fourth most abundant chemical element in the universe (after hydrogen, helium, and oxygen), was formed mainly in white dwarf stars, particularly those bigger than twice the mass of the sun. As these stars reached the end of their lifecycles, they ejected these heavier elements, among them carbon and oxygen, throughout the universe. These heavier elements allowed for the formation of new objects, including rocky planets and other bodies. According to the nebular hypothesis, the formation and evolution of the Solar System began 4.6 Gya with the gravitational collapse of a small part of a giant molecular cloud. Most of the collapsing mass collected in the center, forming the Sun, while the rest flattened into a protoplanetary disk out of which the planets, moons, asteroids, and other small Solar System bodies formed.

Emergence of Earth

The Earth was formed 4.54 Gya. The Hadean Earth (from its formation until 4 Gya) was at first inhospitable to any living organisms. During its formation, the Earth lost a significant part of its initial mass, and consequentially lacked the gravity to hold molecular hydrogen and the bulk of the original inert gases. The atmosphere consisted largely of water vapor, nitrogen, and carbon dioxide, with smaller amounts of carbon monoxide, hydrogen, and sulfur compounds. The solution of carbon dioxide in water is thought to have made the seas slightly acidic, with a pH of about 5.5. The Hadean atmosphere has been characterized as a "gigantic, productive outdoor chemical laboratory," similar to volcanic gases today which still support some abiotic chemistry.

Oceans may have appeared as soon as 200 million years after the Earth formed, in a near-boiling (100 C) reducing environment, as the pH of 5.8 rose rapidly toward neutral. This scenario has found support from the dating of 4.404 Gya zircon crystals from metamorphosed quartzite of Mount Narryer in Western Australia. Despite the likely increased volcanism, the Earth may have been a water world between 4.4 and 4.3 Gya, with little if any continental crust, a turbulent atmosphere, and a hydrosphere subject to intense ultraviolet light from a T Tauri stage Sun, from cosmic radiation, and from continued asteroid and comet impacts.

The Late Heavy Bombardment hypothesis posits that the Hadean environment between 4.28 and 3.8 Gya was highly hazardous to life. Following the Nice model, changes in the orbits of the giant planets may have bombarded the Earth with asteroids and comets that pockmarked the Moon and inner planets. Frequent collisions would have made photosynthesis unviable. The periods between such devastating events give time windows for the possible origin of life in early environments. If the deep marine hydrothermal setting was the site for the origin of life, then abiogenesis could have happened as early as 4.0-4.2 Gya. If the site was at the surface of the Earth, abiogenesis could have occurred only between 3.7 and 4.0 Gya. However, new lunar surveys and samples have led scientists, including an architect of the Nice model, to deemphasize the significance of the Late Heavy Bombardment.

If life evolved in the ocean at depths of more than ten meters, it would have been shielded both from late impacts and the then high levels of ultraviolet radiation from the sun. Geothermically heated oceanic crust could have yielded far more organic compounds through deep hydrothermal vents than the Miller–Urey experiments indicated. The available energy is maximized at 100–150 °C, the temperatures at which hyperthermophilic bacteria and thermoacidophilic archaea live. These modern organisms may be among the closest surviving relatives of the LUCA.

Earliest evidence of life

Life existed on Earth more than 3.5 Gya, during the Eoarchean when sufficient crust had solidified following the molten Hadean. The earliest physical evidence of life so far found consists of microfossils in the Nuvvuagittuq Greenstone Belt of Northern Quebec, in banded iron formation rocks at least 3.77 and possibly 4.28 Gya. The micro-organisms lived within hydrothermal vent precipitates, soon after the 4.4 Gya formation of oceans during the Hadean. The microbes resembled modern hydrothermal vent bacteria, supporting the view that abiogenesis began in such an environment.

Biogenic graphite has been found in 3.7 Gya metasedimentary rocks from southwestern Greenland and in microbial mat fossils from 3.49 Gya Western Australian sandstone. Evidence of early life in rocks from Akilia Island, near the Isua supracrustal belt in southwestern Greenland, dating to 3.7 Gya, have shown biogenic carbon isotopes. In other parts of the Isua supracrustal belt, graphite inclusions trapped within garnet crystals are connected to the other elements of life: oxygen, nitrogen, and possibly phosphorus in the form of phosphate, providing further evidence for life 3.7 Gya. In the Pilbara region of Western Australia, compelling evidence of early life was found in pyrite-bearing sandstone in a fossilized beach, with rounded tubular cells that oxidized sulfur by photosynthesis in the absence of oxygen. Zircons from Western Australia imply that life existed on Earth at least 4.1 Gya.

The Pilbara region of Western Australia contains the Dresser Formation with rocks 3.48 Gya, including layered structures called stromatolites. Their modern counterparts are created by photosynthetic micro-organisms including cyanobacteria. These lie within undeformed hydrothermal-sedimentary strata; their texture indicates a biogenic origin. Parts of the Dresser formation preserve hot springs on land, but other regions seem to have been shallow seas.

Producing molecules: prebiotic synthesis
All chemical elements except for hydrogen and helium derive from stellar nucleosynthesis. The basic chemical ingredients of life – the carbon-hydrogen molecule (CH), the carbon-hydrogen positive ion (CH+) and the carbon ion (C+) – were produced by ultraviolet light from stars. Complex molecules, including organic molecules, form naturally both in space and on planets. Organic molecules on the early Earth could have had either terrestrial origins, with organic molecule synthesis driven by impact shocks or by other energy sources, such as ultraviolet light, redox coupling, or electrical discharges; or extraterrestrial origins (pseudo-panspermia), with organic molecules formed in interstellar dust clouds raining down on to the planet.

Observed extraterrestrial organic molecules

An organic compound is a chemical whose molecules contain carbon. Carbon is abundant in the Sun, stars, comets, and in the atmospheres of most planets. Organic compounds are relatively common in space, formed by "factories of complex molecular synthesis" which occur in molecular clouds and circumstellar envelopes, and chemically evolve after reactions are initiated mostly by ionizing radiation. Purine and pyrimidine nucleobases including guanine, adenine, cytosine, uracil, and thymine have been found in meteorites. These could have provided the materials for DNA and RNA to form on the early Earth. The amino acid glycine was found in material ejected from comet Wild 2; it had earlier been detected in meteorites. Comets are encrusted with dark material, thought to be a tar-like organic substance formed from simple carbon compounds under ionizing radiation. A rain of material from comets could have brought such complex organic molecules to Earth. It is estimated that during the Late Heavy Bombardment, meteorites may have delivered up to five million tons of organic prebiotic elements to Earth per year.

PAH world hypothesis

Polycyclic aromatic hydrocarbons (PAH) are the most common and abundant polyatomic molecules in the observable universe, and are a major store of carbon. They seem to have formed shortly after the Big Bang, and are associated with new stars and exoplanets. They are a likely constituent of Earth's primordial sea. PAHs have been detected in nebulae, and in the interstellar medium, in comets, and in meteorites.

The PAH world hypothesis posits PAHs as precursors to the RNA world. A star, HH 46-IR, resembling the sun early in its life, is surrounded by a disk of material which contains molecules including cyanide compounds, hydrocarbons, and carbon monoxide. PAHs in the interstellar medium can be transformed through hydrogenation, oxygenation, and hydroxylation to more complex organic compounds used in living cells.

Nucleobases

The majority of organic compounds introduced on Earth by interstellar dust particles have helped to form complex molecules, thanks to their peculiar surface-catalytic activities. Studies of the 12C/13C isotopic ratios of organic compounds in the Murchison meteorite suggest that the RNA component uracil and related molecules, including xanthine, were formed extraterrestrially. NASA studies of meteorites suggest that all four DNA nucleobases (adenine, guanine and related organic molecules) have been formed in outer space. The cosmic dust permeating the universe contains complex organics ("amorphous organic solids with a mixed aromatic–aliphatic structure") that could be created rapidly by stars. Glycolaldehyde, a sugar molecule and RNA precursor, has been detected in regions of space including around protostars and on meteorites.

Laboratory synthesis
As early as the 1860s, experiments demonstrated that biologically relevant molecules can be produced from interaction of simple carbon sources with abundant inorganic catalysts. The spontaneous formation of complex polymers from abiotically generated monomers under the conditions posited by the "soup" theory is not straightforward. Besides the necessary basic organic monomers, compounds that would have prohibited the formation of polymers were also formed in high concentration during the Miller–Urey and Joan Oró experiments. Biology uses essentially 20 amino acids for its coded protein enzymes, representing a very small subset of the structurally possible products. Since life tends to use whatever is available, an explanation is needed for why the set used is so small.

Sugars

Alexander Butlerov showed in 1861 that the formose reaction created sugars including tetroses, pentoses, and hexoses when formaldehyde is heated under basic conditions with divalent metal ions like calcium. R. Breslow proposed that the reaction was autocatalytic in 1959.

Nucleobases
Nucleobases like guanine and adenine can be synthesized from simple carbon and nitrogen sources like hydrogen cyanide (HCN) and ammonia. Formamide produces all four ribonucleotides when warmed with terrestrial minerals. Formamide is ubiquitous in the Universe, produced by the reaction of water and HCN. It can be concentrated by the evaporation of water. HCN is poisonous only to aerobic organisms (eukaryotes and aerobic bacteria), which did not yet exist. It can play roles in other chemical processes such as the synthesis of the amino acid glycine.

DNA and RNA components including uracil, cytosine and thymine can be synthesized under outer space conditions, using starting chemicals such as pyrimidine found in meteorites. Pyrimidine may have been formed in red giant stars or in interstellar dust and gas clouds. All four RNA-bases may be synthesized from formamide in high-energy density events like extraterrestrial impacts.

Other pathways for synthesizing bases from inorganic materials have been reported. Freezing temperatures are advantageous for the synthesis of purines, due to the concentrating effect for key precursors such as hydrogen cyanide. However, while adenine and guanine require freezing conditions for synthesis, cytosine and uracil may require boiling temperatures. Seven amino acids and eleven types of nucleobases formed in ice when ammonia and cyanide were left in a freezer for 25 years. S-triazines (alternative nucleobases), pyrimidines including cytosine and uracil, and adenine can be synthesized by subjecting a urea solution to freeze-thaw cycles under a reductive atmosphere, with spark discharges as an energy source. The explanation given for the unusual speed of these reactions at such a low temperature is eutectic freezing, which crowds impurities in microscopic pockets of liquid within the ice, causing the molecules to collide more often.

Producing suitable vesicles

The lipid world theory postulates that the first self-replicating object was lipid-like. Phospholipids form lipid bilayers in water while under agitation—the same structure as in cell membranes. These molecules were not present on early Earth, but other amphiphilic long-chain molecules also form membranes. These bodies may expand by insertion of additional lipids, and may spontaneously split into two offspring of similar size and composition. The main idea is that the molecular composition of the lipid bodies is a preliminary to information storage, and that evolution led to the appearance of polymers like RNA that store information. Studies on vesicles from amphiphiles that might have existed in the prebiotic world have so far been limited to systems of one or two types of amphiphiles.

A lipid bilayer membrane could be composed of a huge number of combinations of arrangements of amphiphiles. The best of these would have favored the constitution of a hypercycle, actually a positive feedback composed of two mutual catalysts represented by a membrane site and a specific compound trapped in the vesicle. Such site/compound pairs are transmissible to the daughter vesicles leading to the emergence of distinct lineages of vesicles, which would have allowed natural selection.

A protocell is a self-organized, self-ordered, spherical collection of lipids proposed as a stepping-stone to the origin of life. The theory of classical irreversible thermodynamics treats self-assembly under a generalized chemical potential within the framework of dissipative systems.

A central question in evolution is how simple protocells first arose and differed in reproductive contribution to the following generation, thus driving the evolution of life. A functional protocell has (as of 2014) not yet been achieved in a laboratory setting. Self-assembled vesicles are essential components of primitive cells. The second law of thermodynamics requires that the universe move in a direction in which entropy increases, yet life is distinguished by its great degree of organization. Therefore, a boundary is needed to separate life processes from non-living matter. Irene Chen and Jack W. Szostak suggest that elementary protocells can give rise to cellular behaviors including primitive forms of differential reproduction, competition, and energy storage. Competition for membrane molecules would favor stabilized membranes, suggesting a selective advantage for the evolution of cross-linked fatty acids and even the phospholipids of today. Such micro-encapsulation would allow for metabolism within the membrane and the exchange of small molecules, while retaining large biomolecules inside. Such a membrane is needed for a cell to create its own electrochemical gradient to store energy by pumping ions across the membrane.

Producing biology

Energy and entropy
Life requires a loss of entropy, or disorder, when molecules organize themselves into living matter. The emergence of life and increased complexity does not contradict the second law of thermodynamics, which states that overall entropy never decreases, since a living organism creates order in some places (e.g. its living body) at the expense of an increase of entropy elsewhere (e.g. heat and waste production).

Multiple sources of energy were available for chemical reactions on the early Earth. Heat from geothermal processes is a standard energy source for chemistry. Other examples include sunlight, lightning, atmospheric entries of micro-meteorites, and implosion of bubbles in sea and ocean waves. This has been confirmed by experiments and simulations.
Unfavorable reactions can be driven by highly favorable ones, as in the case of iron-sulfur chemistry. For example, this was probably important for carbon fixation. Carbon fixation by reaction of CO2 with H2S via iron-sulfur chemistry is favorable, and occurs at neutral pH and 100 °C. Iron-sulfur surfaces, which are abundant near hydrothermal vents, can drive the production of small amounts of amino acids and other biomolecules.

Chemiosmosis

In 1961, Peter Mitchell proposed chemiosmosis as a cell's primary system of energy conversion. The mechanism, now ubiquitous in living cells, powers energy conversion in micro-organisms and in the mitochondria of eukaryotes, making it a likely candidate for early life. Mitochondria produce adenosine triphosphate (ATP), the energy currency of the cell used to drive cellular processes such as chemical syntheses. The mechanism of ATP synthesis involves a closed membrane in which the ATP synthase enzyme is embedded. The energy required to release strongly-bound ATP has its origin in protons that move across the membrane. In modern cells, those proton movements are caused by the pumping of ions across the membrane, maintaining an electrochemical gradient. In the first organisms, the gradient could have been provided by the difference in chemical composition between the flow from a hydrothermal vent and the surrounding seawater, or perhaps meteoric quinones that were conducive to the development of chemiosmotic energy across lipid membranes if at a terrestrial origin.

The RNA world

The RNA world hypothesis describes an early Earth with self-replicating and catalytic RNA but no DNA or proteins. Many researchers concur that an RNA world must have preceded the DNA-based life that now dominates. However, RNA-based life may not have been the first to exist. Another model echoes Darwin's "warm little pond" with cycles of wetting and drying.

RNA is central to the translation process. Small RNAs can catalyze all the chemical groups and information transfers required for life. RNA both expresses and maintains genetic information in modern organisms; and the chemical components of RNA are easily synthesized under the conditions that approximated the early Earth, which were very different from those that prevail today. The structure of the ribozyme has been called the "smoking gun", with a central core of RNA and no amino acid side chains within 18 Å of the active site that catalyzes peptide bond formation.

The concept of the RNA world was proposed in 1962 by Alexander Rich, and the term was coined by Walter Gilbert in 1986. There were initial difficulties in the explanation of the abiotic synthesis of the nucleotides cytosine and uracil. Subsequent research has shown possible routes of synthesis; for example, formamide produces all four ribonucleotides and other biological molecules when warmed in the presence of various terrestrial minerals.

RNA replicase can function as both code and catalyst for further RNA replication, i.e. it can be autocatalytic. Jack Szostak has shown that certain catalytic RNAs can join smaller RNA sequences together, creating the potential for self-replication. The RNA replication systems, which include two ribozymes that catalyze each other's synthesis, showed a doubling time of the product of about one hour, and were subject to natural selection under the experimental conditions. If such conditions were present on early Earth, then natural selection would favor the proliferation of such autocatalytic sets, to which further functionalities could be added. Self-assembly of RNA may occur spontaneously in hydrothermal vents. A preliminary form of tRNA could have assembled into such a replicator molecule.

Possible precursors to protein synthesis include the synthesis of short peptide cofactors or the self-catalysing duplication of RNA. It is likely that the ancestral ribosome was composed entirely of RNA, although some roles have since been taken over by proteins. Major remaining questions on this topic include identifying the selective force for the evolution of the ribosome and determining how the genetic code arose.

Eugene Koonin has argued that "no compelling scenarios currently exist for the origin of replication and translation, the key processes that together comprise the core of biological systems and the apparent pre-requisite of biological evolution. The RNA World concept might offer the best chance for the resolution of this conundrum but so far cannot adequately account for the emergence of an efficient RNA replicase or the translation system."

Phylogeny and LUCA

Starting with the work of Carl Woese from 1977 onward, genomics studies have placed the last universal common ancestor (LUCA) of all modern life-forms between Bacteria and a clade formed by Archaea and Eukaryota in the phylogenetic tree of life. It lived over 4 Gya. A minority of studies have placed the LUCA in Bacteria, proposing that Archaea and Eukaryota are evolutionarily derived from within Eubacteria; Thomas Cavalier-Smith suggested that the phenotypically diverse bacterial phylum Chloroflexota contained the LUCA.

In 2016, a set of 355 genes likely present in the LUCA was identified. A total of 6.1 million prokaryotic genes from Bacteria and Archaea were sequenced, identifying 355 protein clusters from among 286,514 protein clusters that were probably common to the LUCA. The results suggest that the LUCA was anaerobic with a Wood–Ljungdahl pathway, nitrogen- and carbon-fixing, thermophilic. Its cofactors suggest dependence upon an environment rich in hydrogen, carbon dioxide, iron, and transition metals. Its genetic material was probably DNA, requiring the 4-nucleotide genetic code, messenger RNA, transfer RNA, and ribosomes to translate the code into proteins such as enzymes. LUCA likely inhabited an anaerobic hydrothermal vent setting in a geochemically active environment. It was evidently already a complex organism, and must have had precursors; it was not the first living thing. The physiology of LUCA has been in dispute.

Leslie Orgel argued that early translation machinery for the genetic code would be susceptible to error catastrophe. Geoffrey Hoffmann however showed that such machinery can be stable in function against "Orgel's paradox".

Suitable geological environments

Deep sea hydrothermal vents

Early micro-fossils may have come from a hot world of gases such as methane, ammonia, carbon dioxide, and hydrogen sulfide, toxic to much current life. Analysis of the tree of life places thermophilic and hyperthermophilic bacteria and archaea closest to the root, suggesting that life may have evolved in a hot environment. The deep sea or alkaline hydrothermal vent theory posits that life began at submarine hydrothermal vents. Martin and Russell have suggested "that life evolved in structured iron monosulphide precipitates in a seepage site hydrothermal mound at a redox, pH, and temperature gradient between sulphide-rich hydrothermal fluid and iron(II)-containing waters of the Hadean ocean floor. The naturally arising, three-dimensional compartmentation observed within fossilized seepage-site metal sulphide precipitates indicates that these inorganic compartments were the precursors of cell walls and membranes found in free-living prokaryotes. The known capability of FeS and NiS to catalyze the synthesis of the acetyl-methylsulphide from carbon monoxide and methylsulphide, constituents of hydrothermal fluid, indicates that pre-biotic syntheses occurred at the inner surfaces of these metal-sulphide-walled compartments".

These form where hydrogen-rich fluids emerge from below the sea floor, as a result of serpentinization of ultra-mafic olivine with seawater and a pH interface with carbon dioxide-rich ocean water. The vents form a sustained chemical energy source derived from redox reactions, in which electron donors (molecular hydrogen) react with electron acceptors (carbon dioxide); see iron–sulfur world theory. These are exothermic reactions.

Russell demonstrated that alkaline vents created an abiogenic proton motive force chemiosmotic gradient, ideal for abiogenesis. Their microscopic compartments "provide a natural means of concentrating organic molecules," composed of iron-sulfur minerals such as mackinawite, endowed these mineral cells with the catalytic properties envisaged by Günter Wächtershäuser. This movement of ions across the membrane depends on a combination of two factors:

 Diffusion force caused by concentration gradient—all particles including ions tend to diffuse from higher concentration to lower.
 Electrostatic force caused by electrical potential gradient—cations like protons H+ tend to diffuse down the electrical potential, anions in the opposite direction.

These two gradients taken together can be expressed as an electrochemical gradient, providing energy for abiogenic synthesis. The proton motive force can be described as the measure of the potential energy stored as a combination of proton and voltage gradients across a membrane (differences in proton concentration and electrical potential).

The surfaces of mineral particles inside deep-ocean hydrothermal vents have catalytic properties similar to those of enzymes and can create simple organic molecules, such as methanol (CH3OH) and formic, acetic, and pyruvic acids out of the dissolved CO2 in the water, if driven by an applied voltage or by reaction with H2 or H2S.

The research reported by Martin in 2016 supports the thesis that life arose at hydrothermal vents, that spontaneous chemistry in the Earth's crust driven by rock–water interactions at disequilibrium thermodynamically underpinned life's origin and that the founding lineages of the archaea and bacteria were H2-dependent autotrophs that used CO2 as their terminal acceptor in energy metabolism. Martin suggests, based upon this evidence, that the LUCA "may have depended heavily on the geothermal energy of the vent to survive". Pores at deep sea hydrothermal vents are suggested to have been occupied
by membrane-bound compartments which promoted biochemical reactions.

Hot springs
Mulkidjanian and co-authors think that marine environments did not provide the ionic balance and composition universally found in cells, or the ions required by essential proteins and ribozymes, especially with respect to high K+/Na+ ratio, Mn2+, Zn2+ and phosphate concentrations. They argue that the only environments that mimic the needed conditions on Earth are hot springs similar to ones at Kamchatka. Mineral deposits in these environments under an anoxic atmosphere would have suitable pH (while current pools in an oxygenated atmosphere would not), contain precipitates of photocatalytic sulfide minerals that absorb harmful ultraviolet radiation, have wet-dry cycles that concentrate substrate solutions to concentrations amenable to spontaneous formation of biopolymers created both by chemical reactions in the hydrothermal environment, and by exposure to UV light during transport from vents to adjacent pools that would promote the formation of biomolecules. The hypothesized pre-biotic environments are similar to hydrothermal vents, with additional components that help explain peculiarities of the LUCA.

A phylogenomic and geochemical analysis of proteins plausibly traced to the LUCA shows that the ionic composition of its intracellular fluid is identical at hot springs. The LUCA likely was dependent upon synthesized organic matter for its growth. Experiments show that RNA-like polymers can be synthesized in multiple wet-dry cycles and exposure to UV light. These polymers became encapsulated in vesicles after condensation, which would not happen in saltwater conditions because of the high concentrations of ionic solutes. A potential source of biomolecules at hot springs was transport by interplanetary dust particles, extraterrestrial projectiles, or atmospheric or geochemical synthesis. Hot spring fields could have been abundant at volcanic landmasses during the Hadean.

Clay

The clay hypothesis was proposed by Graham Cairns-Smith in 1985. It postulates that complex organic molecules arose gradually on pre-existing, non-organic replication surfaces of silicate crystals in contact with an aqueous solution. The clay mineral montmorillonite has been shown to catalyze the polymerization of RNA in aqueous solution from nucleotide monomers, and the formation of membranes from lipids. In 1998, Hyman Hartman proposed that "the first organisms were self-replicating iron-rich clays which fixed carbon dioxide into oxalic acid and other dicarboxylic acids. This system of replicating clays and their metabolic phenotype then evolved into the sulfide rich region of the hot spring acquiring the ability to fix nitrogen. Finally phosphate was incorporated into the evolving system which allowed the synthesis of nucleotides and phospholipids."

Iron–sulfur world

In the 1980s, Günter Wächtershäuser and Karl Popper postulated the iron–sulfur world hypothesis for the evolution of pre-biotic chemical pathways. It traces today's biochemistry to primordial reactions which synthesize organic building blocks from gases. Wächtershäuser systems have a built-in source of energy: iron sulfides such as pyrite. The energy released by oxidising these metal sulfides can support synthesis of organic molecules. Such systems may have evolved into autocatalytic sets constituting self-replicating, metabolically active entities predating modern life forms. Experiments with sulfides in an aqueous environment at 100 °C produced a small yield of dipeptides (0.4% to 12.4%) and a smaller yield of tripeptides (0.10%). However, under the same conditions, dipeptides were quickly broken down.

Several models postulate a primitive metabolism, allowing RNA replication to emerge later. The centrality of the Krebs cycle (citric acid cycle) to energy production in aerobic organisms, and in drawing in carbon dioxide and hydrogen ions in biosynthesis of complex organic chemicals, suggests that it was one of the first parts of the metabolism to evolve. Concordantly, geochemists Jack W. Szostak and Kate Adamala demonstrated that non-enzymatic RNA replication in primitive protocells is only possible in the presence of weak cation chelators like citric acid. This provides further evidence for the central role of citric acid in primordial metabolism.
Russell has proposed that "the purpose of life is to hydrogenate carbon dioxide" (as part of a "metabolism-first," rather than a "genetics-first," scenario). The physicist Jeremy England has argued from general thermodynamic considerations that life was inevitable. An early version of this idea was Oparin's 1924 proposal for self-replicating vesicles. In the 1980s and 1990s came Wächtershäuser's iron–sulfur world theory and Christian de Duve's thioester models. More abstract and theoretical arguments for metabolism without genes include Freeman Dyson's mathematical model and Stuart Kauffman's collectively autocatalytic sets in the 1980s. Kauffman's work has been criticized for ignoring the role of energy in driving biochemical reactions in cells.

A multistep biochemical pathway like the Krebs cycle did not just self-organize on the surface of a mineral; it must have been preceded by simpler pathways. The Wood–Ljungdahl pathway is compatible with self-organization on a metal sulfide surface. Its key enzyme unit, carbon monoxide dehydrogenase/acetyl-CoA synthase, contains mixed nickel-iron-sulfur clusters in its reaction centers and catalyzes the formation of acetyl-CoA. However, prebiotic thiolated and thioester compounds are thermodynamically and kinetically unlikely to accumulate in the presumed prebiotic conditions of hydrothermal vents. One possibility is that cysteine and homocysteine may have reacted with nitriles from the Strecker reaction, forming catalytic thiol-rich polypeptides.

Zinc world
Armen Mulkidjanian's zinc world (Zn-world) hypothesis extends Wächtershäuser's pyrite hypothesis. The Zn-world theory proposes that hydrothermal fluids rich in H2S interacting with cold primordial ocean (or Darwin's "warm little pond") water precipitated metal sulfide particles. Oceanic hydrothermal systems have a zonal structure reflected in ancient volcanogenic massive sulfide ore deposits. They reach many kilometers in diameter and date back to the Archean. Most abundant are pyrite (FeS2), chalcopyrite (CuFeS2), and sphalerite (ZnS), with additions of galena (PbS) and alabandite (MnS). ZnS and MnS have a unique ability to store radiation energy, e.g. from ultraviolet light. When replicating molecules were originating, the primordial atmospheric pressure was high enough (>100 bar) to precipitate near the Earth's surface, and ultraviolet irradiation was 10 to 100 times more intense than now; hence the photosynthetic properties mediated by ZnS provided the right energy conditions for the synthesis of informational and metabolic molecules and the selection of photostable nucleobases.

The Zn-world theory has been filled out with evidence for the ionic constitution of the interior of the first protocells. In 1926, the Canadian biochemist Archibald Macallum noted the resemblance of body fluids such as blood and lymph to seawater; however, the inorganic composition of all cells differ from that of modern seawater, which led Mulkidjanian and colleagues to reconstruct the "hatcheries" of the first cells combining geochemical analysis with phylogenomic scrutiny of the inorganic ion requirements of modern cells. Geochemical reconstruction shows that this ionic composition could not have existed in the ocean but is compatible with inland geothermal systems. In the oxygen-depleted, CO2-dominated primordial atmosphere, the chemistry of water condensates near geothermal fields would resemble the internal milieu of modern cells. Therefore, precellular evolution may have taken place in shallow "Darwin ponds" lined with porous silicate minerals mixed with metal sulfides and enriched in K+, Zn2+, and phosphorus compounds.

Homochirality

Homochirality is the geometric uniformity of materials composed of chiral (non-mirror-symmetric) units. Living organisms use molecules that have the same chirality (handedness): with almost no exceptions, amino acids are left-handed while nucleotides and sugars are right-handed. Chiral molecules can be synthesized, but in the absence of a chiral source or a chiral catalyst, they are formed in a 50/50 (racemic) mixture of both forms. Known mechanisms for the production of non-racemic mixtures from racemic starting materials include: asymmetric physical laws, such as the electroweak interaction; asymmetric environments, such as those caused by circularly polarized light, quartz crystals, or the Earth's rotation, statistical fluctuations during racemic synthesis, and spontaneous symmetry breaking. Once established, chirality would be selected for. A small bias (enantiomeric excess) in the population can be amplified into a large one by asymmetric autocatalysis, such as in the Soai reaction. In asymmetric autocatalysis, the catalyst is a chiral molecule, which means that a chiral molecule is catalyzing its own production. An initial enantiomeric excess, such as can be produced by polarized light, then allows the more abundant enantiomer to outcompete the other. Homochirality may have started in outer space, as on the Murchison meteorite the amino acid L-alanine is more than twice as frequent as its D form, and L-glutamic acid is more than three times as abundant as its D counterpart. Amino acids from meteorites show a left-handed bias, whereas sugars show a predominantly right-handed bias, as found in living organisms, suggesting an abiogenic origin of these compounds.

See also
 Autopoiesis

References

Explanatory footnotes

Citations

General and cited sources

 
 
 
 
 
 
 
 
 
 
 
 
 
 
 
 
 
 
 
  International Symposium on the Origin of Life on the Earth (held at Moscow, 19–24 August 1957)
 
 
  Proceedings of the SPIE held at San Jose, California, 22–24 January 2001
 
 
 
 
 
 
 
  Proceedings of the SPIE held at San Diego, California, 31 July–2 August 2005

External links

 Making headway with the mysteries of life’s origins – Adam Mann (PNAS; 14 April 2021)
 Exploring Life's Origins a virtual exhibit at the Museum of Science (Boston)
 How life began on Earth – Marcia Malory (Earth Facts; 2015)
 The Origins of Life – Richard Dawkins et al. (BBC Radio; 2004)
 Life in the Universe – Essay by Stephen Hawking (1996)

 
Astrobiology
Beginnings
Evolutionarily significant biological phenomena
Evolutionary biology
Global events
Natural events
Origins
Prebiotic chemistry